St Salvator's Hall (affectionately known as Sallies) is a student hall of residence at the University of St Andrews. It lies close to the quadrangle of the United College, St Andrews and St Salvator's Chapel, a foundation which was endowed by King James II of Scotland. The Hall is in an area between North Street and The Scores.  Architecturally, it has been described as a "rambling Gothic dormitory".

History

In the 1920s, the vice-chancellor of the University of St Andrews, Sir James Irvine made plans to extend university buildings and St Salvator's Hall was one of the first outcomes of this vision. The hall, originally a male-only residence, was built between 1930 and 1933, funded by the American Philanthropist, Edward Harkness and modelled on Oxbridge colleges. The architects were Mills & Shepherd who had previously built University Hall. It was extended between 1937 and 1939 to the cost of £40,000, and underwent a £1.7 million refurbishment in 1994. Since 1971 the building and its sundial have been listed as Grade B by Historic Scotland. The stained glass windows, designed by William Wilson, and paintings in its oak-panelled dining room feature associates and benefactors of the University of St Andrews such as David Beaton, James Graham, 1st Marquess of Montrose and Edward Harkness.

On 15 January 1945 many students at the hall became ill after consuming meat that originated from a local butcher contaminated with Arsenic trioxide. Ninety of the 100 men who sat down to lunch were sick with flux.

In November 2020, during routine inspection, legionella bacteria was found in the water supply for the hall. This prompted temporary shower facilities to be set up and students to be provided with bottled water.

Facilities

There are 65 single rooms and 63 shared rooms. In total it houses 196 students. As well as several rooms downstairs the hall has three floors: A, B and C; and a further wing known as D block which was the former servants quarters. Until recently residents of D block were unable to access the main building without going outside, however, a hallway extension was recently built, allowing interior access. Downstairs there is an oak-panelled Common Room with a Grand Piano and a television provided for the use of students. It is filled with photographs of students from the 1930s to the present day. St Salvator's Hall has its own annexe, Gannochy House, which, until 2014, housed only postgraduates; it is no longer home to postgraduates but rather 85 undergraduate students who dine and use communal spaces in the main building of St Salvator's. Gannochy House received its name from the Gannochy Trust which helped to fund its construction. The annexe is fitted with kitchens, a study room, laundry facilities and its own courtyard.

At the west wing of the building there is a small library and a study room. A computer room with pigeon holes for residents' post is also situated on the ground floor. In the west basement there is a snooker table, table tennis, an overhead projector and laundry facilities. It is the setting for movie nights organised by the Hall Committee. The basement was refurbished in the summer of 2009, aided by a generous bequest.

The student bedrooms are spread on three floors above. In the early years each bedroom was provided with a fireplace but now they come with a desk, a wardrobe (sometimes built-in), a bookcase and a wash hand basin. There are pantries and bathrooms on each floor. Each room has views of either St Andrews Bay or the edge of the United College Quadrangle and the front lawn. The D-Block extension houses some students and is connected to the main building by a corridor.

Students are catered for 19 meals during the week; all except weekend dinners. Two courses are offered at lunchtime and three courses at dinner.

The Hall Committee meets weekly in the Regents Room. The Hall Committee are responsible for hosting weekly events for residents from themed ceilidhs to pub quizzes and whisky tasting. In addition to this, four members of the Hall Committee form the Executive Committee who work closely with the residence managers and Wardennial Team. There are an additional four Assistant Wardens who are available each evening for residents to contact.

It is used as conference venue and as accommodation for residential camps during the summer.

Reputation and traditions
St Salvator's Hall is acknowledged by students to be one of the most prestigious residences for undergraduates in St Andrews and one with its own distinct traditions. A 1965 Guide book described it as "one of the finest students' residences in Britain".

Formal Dinners

A High Table takes place on Thursdays during term time; in which resident guests sit with the Senior Student, members of the Wardennial Team and a guest (usually an academic) from outside of the hall; preceding the three course meal is a sherry reception and following the meal is an evening of port, tea, coffee and a talk by the guest, both held in the Regents' Room. At each dinner students dress formally and wear their undergraduate gowns. Latin grace is said by the Warden and all hall residents stand as those on the High Table enter the dining hall. For the Christmas formal dinner all of the Hall Committee sit on the High Table then champagne and Christmas carols are enjoyed in the Common Room by all the students. At the end of the academic year a High Table dinner for graduating students (Valedictorians) is held.

Annual Events

Freshers' Week is organised by the hall committee and includes several events designed to integrate new students into life at the university. The ball is held at the beginning of the second semester and is organised by the Ball Conveners on the Hall Committee.  Before final exams "Sallies Day" is celebrated on the front lawn where students picnic and drink Pimm's. The hall is well positioned for the annual May Dip and May Ball.

Notable people associated with St Salvator's Hall

 Walter Ledermann, a respected Mathematician who died on 22 May 2009 lived in the hall as an undergraduate. He came on a scholarship designed by the university to help those persecuted in Nazi Germany.
 In 1945, Sir D'arcy Wentworth Thompson, winner of the Darwin Medal was in the hall at a dinner held in his honour. During the Second World War when a whale had been washed ashore, he took a cleaver from the hall kitchen, went down to the bay and cut a large steak from it which was enjoyed by the students that evening.
 Sir James W. Black, recipient of the Nobel Prize for Medicine in 1988, lived in St Salvator's Hall during his undergraduate years.
 The mascot of the University of St Andrews Charities Committee, Rory McLion was "born in the basement of St Salvator's Hall in October 1977"
 The Prince and Princess of Wales (then Prince William and Catherine Middleton) both lived in St Salvator's Hall during their first year at the university.

References

External links
 St Salvator's Hall Website
 University of St Andrews
 Digital Images from the Royal Commission on the Ancient and Historical Monuments of Scotland
 University of St Andrews Photographic Database
 St Salvator's Hall Ball 2009

University of St Andrews halls of residence
Category B listed buildings in Fife
1933 establishments in Scotland